4th Tennessee Cavalry Regiment may refer to:

 4th Cavalry Regiment (United States), a cavalry regiment in the United States Army, active from 1855 to the present
 4th Tennessee Cavalry Regiment (Starnes'-McLemore's), a cavalry regiment in the Confederate States Army during the American Civil War, active from May 1862 to April 26, 1865
 4th Tennessee Cavalry Regiment (Union), a cavalry regiment in the Union Army during the American Civil War, active from July 1862 to July 12, 1865.